Xona Games is an independent Canadian video game developer founded in 2008 and headquartered in Yarmouth, Nova Scotia, Canada.

Games
The company makes shoot 'em up games, targeting primarily Xbox LIVE Indie Games and Xbox LIVE Arcade which are especially popular in the Japanese market.  The company and many of their games have won awards, including the Rogers Small Business Big Idea Contest.

Games released by Xona Games:

Additional games in development by Xona Games include a new version of Score Rush, Decimation X4, and Duality ZF. Xona Games was announced as an official ID@Xbox Xbox One Developer.

Awards
Xona Games' games has won a total of $180,961.71 in contests, including the $100,000 Innovacorp I-3 competition and the $50,000 Tizen App Challenge.  Decimation X3 was named one of the top Xbox Live Indie Games by Official Xbox Magazine.  Duality ZF was a finalist in the 2010 Dream.Build.Play contest, ranking #5 worldwide.

References

External links
Official website

Video game companies of Canada
Video game development companies
Companies based in Nova Scotia
Yarmouth, Nova Scotia
Video game companies established in 2008
2008 establishments in Nova Scotia